Eduardo Schwank was the defending champion but decided not to participate.
Fabio Fognini defeated Paul Capdeville 6–2, 7–6(2) in the final.

Seeds

Draw

Finals

Top half

Bottom half

References
 Main Draw
 Qualifying Draw

Copa Petrobras Santiago - Singles
2010 Singles